Gawroniec  (German Gersdorf) is a village in the administrative district of Gmina Połczyn-Zdrój, within Świdwin County, West Pomeranian Voivodeship, in north-western Poland.

For the region's history, see History of Pomerania.

The village has a population of 490.

Notable residents 
 Friedrich Wilhelm von Borcke (1693–1769),  Prussian politician
 Kaspar Wilhelm von Borcke (1704–1747), Prussian politician
 Otto Dann (1937-2014), German historian

References

Gawroniec